Rodolfo Choperena Irizarri (February 11, 1905 – July 19, 1969) was a Mexican basketball player who competed in the 1936 Summer Olympics. Born in Mexico City, he was part of the Mexican basketball team, which won the bronze medal. He played two matches.

References

External links
Rodolfo Choperena's profile at databaseOlympics
XI JUEGOS OLIMPICOS BERLIN 1936 BRONCE | EQUIPO DE BALONCESTO 

1905 births
1969 deaths
Basketball players at the 1936 Summer Olympics
Mexican men's basketball players
Olympic basketball players of Mexico
Olympic bronze medalists for Mexico
Basketball players from Mexico City
Olympic medalists in basketball
Medalists at the 1936 Summer Olympics